Oost-, West- en Middelbeers was a municipality in the Dutch province of North Brabant. It included the villages Oostelbeers, Middelbeers, and Westelbeers.

The municipality existed until 1997, when it became part of Oirschot.

References

Municipalities of the Netherlands disestablished in 1997
Former municipalities of North Brabant
Oirschot